Peces is the debut album by the Chilean rock band Lucybell, released in 1995. It was an immediate commercial and critical success in Chile, having followed on the heels of singles "De Sudor Y Ternura", "Vete" and the popular "Cuando Respiro en tu Boca".

Track listing
All tracks produced by Lucybell and written by Claudio Valenzuela.

Personnel

Musicians
Claudio Valenzuela – vocals, lead guitar.
Marcelo Muñoz – bass guitar, rhythm guitar.
Gabriel Vigliensoni – keyboards, rhythm guitar.
Francisco González – drums
Lucybell – producer

Production
Mario Breuer – producer, mixing, mastering (tracks 1-10)
Hernan Rojas – producer (tracks 11, 12), engineer, mixing.
Fernando Urrutia – engineer.
Piedad Rivadeneira – art direction, design, concept, cover design.
Alejandro Barruel – photography.
Pablo Rodríguez - management.

References

1995 debut albums
Lucybell albums
Spanish-language albums
EMI Latin albums
EMI Records albums